Men in Aida is a homophonic translation of Book One of Homer's Iliad into a farcical bathhouse scenario, perhaps alluding to the homoerotic aspects of ancient Greek culture.  It was written by the language poet David Melnick, and is an example of poetic postmodernism. In 2015, all three books of the Iliad translated by Melnick were published by independent publishing house Uitgeverij under the title Men in Aïda.

It opens:
Men in Aida, they appeal, eh? A day, O Achilles.
Allow men in, emery Achaians. All gay ethic, eh?
Paul asked if team mousse suck, as Aida, pro, yaps in.

Corresponding to the Greek:
μῆνιν ἄειδε θεὰ Πηληϊάδεω Ἀχιλῆος
οὐλομένην, ἣ μυρί᾽ Ἀχαιοῖς ἄλγε᾽ ἔθηκε,
πολλὰς δ᾽ ἰφθίμους ψυχὰς Ἄϊδι προΐαψεν

Transliterated:
mēnin aeide thea pēlēiadeō Akhilēos
oulomenēn, he muri' Akhaiois alge' ethēke,
pollas d' iphthimous psukhas Aidi proiapsen

Literal translation:
The wrath sing, goddess, of Peleus' son, Achilles,
that destructive wrath which brought countless woes upon the Achaeans,
and sent forth to Hades many valiant souls

References

1983 in LGBT history
1983 poems
1980s LGBT literature
Homophonic translation
LGBT poetry
LGBT literature in the United States
Poetry based on the Iliad
Modern adaptations of the Iliad